Kim Gi-hyeon or Kim Ki-hyon may refer to:
 Kim Ki-hyeon (born 1945), South Korean actor
 Kim Gi-hyeon (born 1959), South Korean politician
 Ki Hyun Kim (born 1991), South Korean mixed martial artist